Eva Wagner-Pasquier (born 14 April 1945, in Oberwarmensteinach) is a German opera manager. She is the daughter of Wolfgang Wagner and Ellen Drexel. On 1 September 2008, Wagner-Pasquier and her half-sister Katharina Wagner were named as joint directors of the Bayreuth Festival which is largely dedicated to the stage works of their great-grandfather Richard Wagner; Wagner-Pasquier resigned from the position in 2015.

Following the death of her uncle Wieland Wagner, Wagner-Pasquier acted as her father's assistant at Bayreuth from 1967 to 1975. She was an assistant at the Vienna State Opera, and an opera director at the Royal Opera House. Wagner-Pasquier oversaw opera and concert productions for the Munich-based classical music company Unitel Films until 1984. She was Director of Programming at the Opéra Bastille from 1987–93. She has also worked for Houston Grand Opera, the Théâtre du Châtelet, the Teatro Real, the Festival d'Aix-en-Provence, and is currently an Artistic Consultant to The Metropolitan Opera. 

The joint appointment at Bayreuth followed a long feud in which Wolfgang had favoured his second wife Gudrun and daughter Katharina as successors, the overseeing committee, the Richard Wagner Foundation of Bayreuth, had favoured Eva, and Wieland's daughter Nike had also put herself forward. The eventual compromise with both Wolfgang and the foundation supporting the sisters followed Gudrun's death in 2007. 

Eva Wagner-Pasquier is married to the French film producer, Yves Pasquier. They have a son Antoine Amadeus Wagner-Pasquier (b. 1982).

Sources
Biography on Seattle Opera site, accessed 24 September 2008
Roger Cohen, "Bayreuth's Director Is Told to Leave", New York Times, March 30, 2001, accessed 14 September 2008
Der Spiegel article A Wagnerian Drama of Succession, 20 July 2007, accessed 12 January 2010

Further reading 
 Carr, Jonathan: The Wagner Clan: The Saga of Germany's Most Illustrious and Infamous Family. Atlantic Monthly Press, 2007. 

German people of French descent
German people of Hungarian descent
German people of English descent
Eva
1945 births
Living people
Opera managers